The Vice-Admiral of South Wales  was responsible for the coastal defence of South Wales.

History
As a vice-admiral, the post holder was the chief of naval administration for his district. His responsibilities included pressing men for naval service, deciding the lawfulness of prizes (captured by privateers), dealing with salvage claims for wrecks and acting as a judge.

In 1863 the registrar of the Admiralty Court stated that the offices had 'for many years been purely honorary' (HCA 50/24 pp. 235–6). Appointments were made by the Lord High Admiral when this officer existed. When the admiralty was in commission appointments were made by the crown by letters patent under the seal of the admiralty court.

Vice-admirals of South Wales
Source (1559–1560):

Source (1660–1754):

Glamorgan
 1559–1570 William Herbert
 1574 David Lewes
 1576 Sir Nicholas Herbert

Cardigan, Carmarthen and Pembroke
 1565–Sir John Perrot
 1569 Walter Devereux, 2nd Viscount Hereford
 1576 Sir William Morgan (died 1583)
 1582 Thomas Williams
 1583–1584 John Morgan Wolfe

Cardigan, Carmarthen, Glamorgan and Pembroke
1585–1601 Henry Herbert, 2nd Earl of Pembroke  (died 1601) 
1601–1630 William Herbert, 3rd Earl of Pembroke 
1630–1650 Philip Herbert, 4th Earl of Pembroke 
1650–1660 No appointment known
1660–1662 William Russell 
1662–1689 Sir Edward Mansel, 4th Baronet 
1689–1713 John Vaughan, 3rd Earl of Carbery 
1714–1715 Thomas Mansell, 1st Baron Mansell 
1715–1754 Charles Powlett, Marquess of Winchester (Duke of Bolton from 1722)

References

Military ranks of the United Kingdom
Vice-Admirals
South Wales